The Museo Nazionale d'Abruzzo is hosted in the Forte Spagnolo of L'Aquila.

The Museum is on three floors: on the ground floor, there is the giant skeleton of an Archidiskon meridionalis (improperly called mammoth, a prehistoric "elephant") found a few miles from Aquila in 1954, and an archeological section with pieces of the Italic pre-Roman period, a section with inscriptions and pieces from the Roman towns in Abruzzo, among them a fine Roman calendar from Amiternum (25 AD). 

On the first floor the medieval and modern art section, with works of Abruzzese artists of the centuries 13-17th such as: the polyptych by Jacobello del Fiore; a Processional Cross by Nicola da Guardiagrele, a group of wooden and terracotta sculptures such as a St Sebastian by Silvestro dell'Aquila and another by Saturnino Gatti; paintings by Flemish and Roman and Neapolitan artists such as Sebastiano Conca, Giulio Cesare Bedeschini, Francesco Solimena, Francesco de Mura; finally the contemporary art section with such artists as M. Vaccari, Renato Guttuso, Virgilio Guidi, Giuseppe Capogrossi, Orfeo Tamburi, and Remo Brindisi.

References

Art museums and galleries in Abruzzo
Buildings and structures in L'Aquila
National museums of Italy